Phyllis Adele Kravitch (August 23, 1920 – June 15, 2017) was a United States circuit judge of the United States Court of Appeals for the Fifth Circuit and later the United States Court of Appeals for the Eleventh Circuit in Atlanta, Georgia.

Education and career

Kravitch was born in Savannah, Georgia, one of four daughters of Aaron Kravitch, an attorney, and Ella B. Wiseman. She attended Armstrong Junior College in Savannah receiving an Associate of Arts degree in 1939. She later obtained her Bachelor of Arts degree from Goucher College in 1941. She graduated with a Bachelor of Laws from the University of Pennsylvania Law School in 1943, her father Aaron's alma mater (Law 1917). At the University of Pennsylvania she served on the Law Review Board of Editors. She was in private practice from 1944 to 1976 and then served from 1977 to 1979 as a judge of the Superior Court of the Eastern Judicial Circuit of Georgia.

Federal judicial service

Kravitch was nominated by President Jimmy Carter on January 19, 1979, to a seat on the United States Court of Appeals for the Fifth Circuit vacated by Judge Lewis Render Morgan. She was confirmed by the United States Senate on March 21, 1979, and received her commission on March 23, 1979, becoming the third woman to serve as a United States Circuit Judge. Her service terminated on October 1, 1981, due to reassignment.

Kravitch was reassigned by operation of law on October 1, 1981, to the United States Court of Appeals for the Eleventh Circuit, to a new seat authorized by 94 Stat. 1994. She assumed senior status on December 31, 1996. Her service terminated on June 15, 2017, due to her death at the Piedmont Hospital in Atlanta.

Feeder judge

Four of Kravitch's law clerks went on to clerk at the United States Supreme Court, including Steven L. Chanenson, Beth Brinkmann, Joseph L. Hoffmann and Paul H. Schwartz.

Later years and death 
Kravitch assumed senior status on December 31, 1996. On June 15, 2017, Kravitch died at Piedmont Hospital in Atlanta.

References

External links

 Oral History of Phyllis A. Kravitch, conducted by Anne Emanuel, Laurie Kotz, July–August 2013. Senior Lawyers Division, American Bar Association. 

1920 births
2017 deaths
People from Savannah, Georgia
20th-century American judges
Armstrong State University alumni
Georgia (U.S. state) lawyers
Georgia (U.S. state) state court judges
Goucher College alumni
Judges of the United States Court of Appeals for the Fifth Circuit
Judges of the United States Court of Appeals for the Eleventh Circuit
United States court of appeals judges appointed by Jimmy Carter
University of Pennsylvania Law School alumni
Superior court judges in the United States
20th-century American women judges